The Restinga Municipal Nature Park is a municipal nature park in the state of Paraná, Brazil. It was created to protect a strip of coastal vegetation, but little has been done to implement the park.

Location

The Restinga Municipal Nature Park extends along the coast of the municipality of Pontal do Paraná.
It consists of the land between the beach and the coastal avenue.
The park is part of the Lagamar Mosaic.

History

The concept of making the restinga area of the municipality a protected area was proposed in 1999 and decreed in 2001.

Status

As of 2004 there was no environmental plan, usage guidelines, infrastructure or supervision.
Parts of the park are well-preserved and natural, while others are environmentally degraded or converted for use in recreation and leisure.
The location of the park on the seafront has value in terms of conserving the environment and protecting against erosion, but conflicts with the use of the area by the local population.
Activities that are incompatible with the status of the park, which in theory is fully protected, include clearing and burning vegetation, levelling of the land, the introduction of exotic plants, making and expanding roads across the park to access the beach, and construction of sports courts and parking lots.

Notes

Sources

Municipal nature parks of Brazil
Protected areas of Paraná (state)
2001 establishments in Brazil